Pin–Up (stylized as PIN-UP) is a biannual independent architecture and design magazine based in New York City. The subtitle of the magazine is The Magazine for Architectural Entertainment and covers a range of highbrow and lowbrow topics in fashion, art, politics, architecture, and design. Pin-Up was founded in 2006 by architect, curator, and creative director Felix Burrichter. Burrichter currently serves as creative director of the publication, and Emmanuel Olunkwa serves as editor.

History 
Burrichter launched the first issue in 2006, which featured a cover story on Rick Owens' house that displayed his furniture designs for the first time to the public. The issue also had interviews with Zaha Hadid, Daniel Arsham, and late Romanian dictator Nicolae Ceaușescu. The designer credits his time as an intern at Butt magazine in Amsterdam under Jop van Bennekom and Gert Jonkers (of Fantastic Man magazine) for inspiration to forge a new magazine that loosened up the idea of the architect as genius. The magazine has run features and interviews on a number of prominent architects such as Frank Gehry, Rem Koolhaas, Zaha Hadid, Maria Pergay, Paulo Mendes da Rocha, Martino Gamper, and Ettore Sottsass. Each issue of the magazine has a theme. Previous issues have explored the "Post-Normal", "Flamboyant Restraint", and "Bourgeois Shenanigans" as well as urban-themed issues on Los Angeles, Berlin, and Milan.

In 2013, Pin-Up Interviews, a collection of over fifty interviews featured in Pin-Up  since 2006, was published by PowerHouse Books. The book covers over 50 conversations and interviews from Pin-Up. The 448-page book has no pictures; subjects include architects Odile Decq and Charles Renfro, fashion designers Rick Owens and Hedi Slimane, and artists Daniel Arsham and Robert Wilson.

Designer Erin Knuston was named the art director of the magazine in 2015. 

Over the summer of 2020, it was announced that Benjamin Ganz would take over as the art director.  

In fall of 2021, Emmanuel Olunkwa was named editor of the magazine, becoming its second editor, succeeding its founder, Felix Burrichter.

For the 30th issue of the magazine, Burrichter celebrated the magazine's 15 years with macro-topics on design and entertainment such as the "new" New York designers, contemplations on the influence of social media and home decorating, and ends with an exploration of the Milanese underground, with its unique signage created by Bob Noorda, Franca Helg, and Franco Albini.

A limited-edition art book, Barbie Dreamhouse: An Architectural Survey, was published by PIN-UP and Mattel in late 2022 to honor the dreamhouses 60-year milestone. The 151-page monograph follows Barbie's Dreamhouses through six iterations as well as original furnishings and architectural blueprints and is co-authored by Burrichter, writer Whitney Mallett, and designer Ben Ganz.

Publications 

 PIN-UP Interviews (Powerhouse Books, 2013)
 Barbie Dreamhouse An Architectural Survey Limited Run Edition by PIN-UP Magazine’s Felix Burrichter, Whitney Mallett, and Ben Ganz (Mattel Creations, 2022)

References

Architecture magazines
Biannual magazines published in the United States
Design magazines
Magazines established in 2006
Magazines published in New York City
Visual arts magazines published in the United States